The Pureko-class (プレコ) locomotives were a group of steam tank locomotives with 2-6-2 wheel arrangement of used by the Chosen Government Railway (Sentetsu) in Korea. The "Pure" name came from the American naming system for steam locomotives, under which locomotives with 2-6-2 wheel arrangement were called "Prairie".

In all, Sentetsu owned 227 locomotives of all Pure classes, whilst privately owned railways owned another 52; of these 279 locomotives, 169 went to the Korean National Railroad in South Korea and 110 to the Korean State Railway in North Korea.

Description
The Baldwin Locomotive Works of the United States built two 2-6-2 tank locomotives in 1911, which were operated by the privately owned Domun Railway after 1920. Both were taken over by Sentetsu after the nationalisation of the Domun Railway in 1929; after the general renumbering of 1938 they were designated プレコ (Pureko) class and numbered プレコ1 and プレコ2.

Postwar: Korean State Railway 부러오 (Purŏo) class
After the Liberation and partition of Korea, both ended up in North Korea after Liberation, and were operated by the Korean State Railway designated 부러오 (Purŏo) class.

References

Locomotives of Korea
Locomotives of North Korea
Railway locomotives introduced in 1911
2-6-2 locomotives
Baldwin locomotives
Freight locomotives